Angus McBride (11 May 1931 – 15 May 2007) was an English historical and fantasy illustrator.

Early life
Born in London to Highland Scottish parents, Angus McBride was orphaned as a child, his mother dying when he was five years old, and his father in World War Two when he was 12. He was educated at the Canterbury Cathedral Choir School. He served his National Service in the Royal Fusiliers, and afterward got a job as an advertising artist.

Career

Due to Britain's poor economic state immediately following World War II, McBride found it necessary to leave for South Africa. In Cape Town, he became a fairly well known and successful artist. However, he felt that he could not expand on his artistic plans in South Africa's small publishing industry. Consequently, in 1961, McBride moved back to England.  He made his first works in educational magazines such as Finding Out and Look and Learn, World of Wonder and Bible Story. In 1975, he began to work with Osprey Publishing's Men-at-Arms series.

As England's economy again suffered in the 1970s, McBride moved with his family back to Cape Town, and continued to work with British and American publishers. He continued to do realistic, historical illustrations for Osprey Publishing, as well as other such work for other military-history publishers (Concord publications, etc.). In fantasy circles, McBride was well known for his illustrations for Iron Crown Enterprises' game Middle-earth Role Playing (MERP) based on J. R. R. Tolkien's writings.

Although a few of his paintings are in oils, McBride mostly preferred to work in gouache colours on illustration boards, making numerous detailed sketches of the composition before starting to paint.

In 2006, McBride moved to Ireland, where he continued to work. He died from a heart attack on 15 May 2007

Illustrations 

 Men-at-Arms (1977–2007) series

Elite series
General Military series
Warrior series
Campaign series

For Iron Crown Enterprises: 
Middle-earth Role Playing
Rolemaster
Middle-earth Collectible Card Game

For Ladybird Horror Classics Series:
 Dracula (1984)
 The Mummy (1985)

References

External links
 Angus McBride work at Osprey Publishing
 Angus McBride illustrations for various J. R. R. Tolkien books

1931 births
2007 deaths
Artists from Cape Town
Artists from London
British emigrants to South Africa
British illustrators
Fantasy artists
Role-playing game artists
Tolkien artists